The 1999 E3 Harelbeke was the 42nd edition of the E3 Harelbeke cycle race and was held on 27 March 1999. The race started and finished in Harelbeke. The race was won by Peter Van Petegem of the TVM team.

General classification

References

1999 in Belgian sport
1999